Habib Ali Kiddie (7 December 1929 – 1982) was a Pakistani field hockey player from 1950 to 1964. He played in the Pakistan national team at the 1952, 1956 and 1960 Summer Olympics, winning one gold medal (in 1960) and one silver medal (in 1956). Habib Ali Kiddie died in 1982 at age 53.

References

External links
 
 

1929 births
1987 deaths
Pakistani male field hockey players
Olympic field hockey players of Pakistan
Olympic gold medalists for Pakistan
Olympic silver medalists for Pakistan
Olympic medalists in field hockey
Medalists at the 1956 Summer Olympics
Medalists at the 1960 Summer Olympics
Field hockey players at the 1952 Summer Olympics
Field hockey players at the 1956 Summer Olympics
Field hockey players at the 1960 Summer Olympics
Asian Games medalists in field hockey
Field hockey players at the 1958 Asian Games
Field hockey players at the 1962 Asian Games
Asian Games gold medalists for Pakistan
Medalists at the 1962 Asian Games
Medalists at the 1958 Asian Games
Field hockey players from Delhi
Indian emigrants to Pakistan